Charlie Creek is a stream in the U.S. state of South Dakota.

A variant name was Fox Creek. Charlie Creek has the name of Charley Claymore, a Native American who settled there.

See also
List of rivers of South Dakota

References

Rivers of Dewey County, South Dakota
Rivers of South Dakota